Women's Volleyball Pro Challenge is the second-tier professional league in Thai domestic volleyball tournament. The top 2 are promoted to Women's Volleyball Thailand League at the end of the season. Seasons run from July to September, with teams playing 6 games each. Most games are played on Saturdays and Sundays, with a few games played on weekdays.

Pro Challenge clubs 
There are 7 clubs in the league, with two relegated teams from Thailand League.

Members

Results summary

Titles by team

See also
 Women's Volleyball Thailand League
 Volleyball Thai-Denmark Super League

External links
 Official website 

Volleyball competitions in Thailand
Thailand
Professional sports leagues in Thailand